The Mount Claro rock-wallaby (Petrogale sharmani), also known as Sharman's rock-wallaby, is a species of rock-wallaby found in northeastern Queensland, Australia. It is a member of a group of seven very closely related species also including Godman's rock-wallaby (P. godmani) and Herbert's rock-wallaby (P. herberti).

Description
It measures 43 to 53 cm high, and its tail is about 50 cm.  It weighs 3.6 to 4.8 kg. The upper body is greyish-brown,  There is very little difference about this species and the six other species of petrogales found in this region; the difference were made only by genetic studies (it has 20 chromosomes).  It is the smallest of the genus and one of the rarest.

Habitat
The Mount Claro rock-wallaby is the smallest of the group, and also has one of the smallest ranges. It is completely restricted to the Seaview and Coane Range west of Ingham.

Diet
It feeds on grass shoots, fruits, seeds and flowers by hand-feeding.

References

External links
Sharman's Rock-wallaby (includes photographs)

Macropods
Mammals of Queensland
Marsupials of Australia
Nature Conservation Act endangered biota
Mammals described in 1992